Santiago Bose (July 25, 1949 – December 3, 2002 in Baguio, Philippines), often known by his nickname Santi Bose, was a mixed-media artist from the Philippines. Bose co-founded the Baguio Arts Guild, and was also an educator, community organizer and art theorist.

Overview

Bose often used indigenous media in his work, ranging from bamboo and volcanic ash, to the cast-offs and debris (found objects, bottles, "trash"). His assemblages communicated a strong sense of folk consciousness and religiosity, and the strength of traditional cultures in a culture inundated with foreign cultural influences.

Bose worked toward raising an awareness of cultural concerns in the Philippines. After studying at the College of Fine Arts at the University of the Philippines between 1967 and 1972, Bose continued his studies in the United States, at the West 17th Print Workshop in New York City.

He returned to Baguio in 1986 and began his explorations into the effects of colonialism on the Philippine national identity. In particular, Bose focused on the resilience of indigenous cultures, like that of his home region of the Cordilleras.

Baguio Arts Guild 
Bose was the founding president of the Baguio Arts Guild in 1987. He became president again in 1992. The Guild is an active cultural association in the northern Cordillera region, emphasizing regional tribal traditions and the importance of using indigenous materials. Bose played a formative role in establishing the Baguio International Arts Festival.

Through his work, Bose addressed difficult social and political concerns in the Philippines. His subject(s) were approached with deep criticality and gravity, although never without a sense of humor and wit, however irreverent.

Bose said, "...The artist cannot but be affected by his society. It is hard to ignore the pressing needs of the nation while making art that serves the nation's elite... We struggled to change society, which is difficult and dangerous, and we also sought to preserve communal aspects of life. I too am haunted by visions of hardship, poverty, disenfranchisement of the 'primitive' tribes, but between outbursts of violence and exploitation are also tenderness, selflessness and a sense of community. These will always remain unspoken and unrecognized unless we make art or music that will help to transform society. The artist takes a stand through the practice of creating art. The artist articulates the Filipino subconscious so that we may be able to show a true picture of ourselves and our world."

Awards and exhibits

Bose was granted the Thirteen Artists Award by the Cultural Center of the Philippines in 1976. He has exhibited in major international events such as the Third Asian Art Show in Fukuoka, Japan and the Havana Biennial held in Cuba, both in 1989. In 1993, he was invited to the First Asia-Pacific Triennial of Contemporary Art held at the Queensland Art Gallery in Brisbane, Australia. In 2000 Bose's work was included in the Asian Art Museum of San Francisco's exhibition "At Home & Abroad, 20 Contemporary Filipino Artists." In June 2002, he was presented the "Gawad ng Maynila: Patnubay ng Sining at Makabagong Pamamaraan" (Cultural Award for New Media presented to outstanding Filipino Artist) by the City of Manila. In 2006, he was posthumously shortlisted for the National Artist award.

As a widely sought after artist for public commissions and artist residencies, Bose's practice included extensive international travel and included several prominent grants and fellowships.

Bose's work was marked by a conscious avoidance of a single recognizable style, by varied foreign and local influences, and by an experimental bent.

Bose has been included in the Asian American Arts Centre's  artasiamerica digital archive.

References

External links
 Santiago Bose

1949 births
2002 deaths
Filipino artists